Frank Addison Porter (born 1859 in Dixmont, Maine) was an American pianist and composer connected for most of his career with the New England Conservatory of Music in Boston. In 1877 he was engaged as tenor and sometime organist at St. Mary's Catholic church at Bangor, Maine.  He went to Boston and entered the Conservatory in 1879, graduating in 1884. During the five years there he studied the piano, the organ, theory, counterpoint, vocal music and the art of conducting. His teachers were Messrs. Turner, Dunham, Emery, Parker, Chadwick, Tamburello and Zerrahn. Immediately after graduating he was engaged as a piano teacher by the conservatory. He went to Germany to study in Leipzig in 1893.

Porter's published works include a prelude and fugue in E minor, mazourkas, nocturnes, a set of easy pieces for teaching, songs for soprano and tenor, a contralto solo with violin 
obligato, a Festival March for two pianos, a Serenade for violin and piano, an overture for four hands, an operetta and other compositions.

Porter died in Belmont, Massachusetts in 1941.

References

1859 births
1941 deaths
American male composers
American composers
New England Conservatory alumni
New England Conservatory faculty
People from Dixmont, Maine
Musicians from Bangor, Maine